Sigrid Aas (born 1980) is a retired Norwegian cross-country skier.

She made her World Cup debut in February 2004, finishing 33rd in a Stockholm sprint. Specializing as a sprinter, she collected her first World Cup points the following week when finishing 28th in Drammen. She improved to a 21st place in February 2005 in Reit im Winkl, 18th place in March 2007 in Lahti and 13th place in March 2007 in Drammen. She also competed in a few relays. Her last World Cup outing was a 21st place in March 2009 in Trondheim.

She represented the sports clubs Strindheim IL.

References 

1980 births
Living people
Sportspeople from Trondheim
Norwegian female cross-country skiers